Xiqiao Town is a town in Nanhai District, Foshan, Guangdong, China. It covers an area of 176.63 square kilometres with registered population of 144,700 and floating population of 70,000. Tourism and textiles are the main industries in the town. Xiqiao Mountain, a famous mountain and scenic spot in Southern Guangdong, is also located at Xiqiao.

Tourism
Xiqiao Mountain is a beautiful scenic spot boasting of a massive metallic sitting Buddha Statue (called the Nanhai Guanyin Bhusa). It can be reached by an hour's hike from the foot of the hill or by car. Evening times are less crowded, and cheaper to visit. It is especially beautiful when illuminated in the dark.

See also
Mount Danxia
Mount Luofu
Mount Xiqiao

References

External links

Official website of Xiqiao Town 
Window of Xiqiao Town 

Nanhai District
Towns in Guangdong